The Peabody-Fordson Historic District, at 91 Peabody Road, south of Big Creek in Clay County, Kentucky, is a historic district which was listed on the  National Register of Historic Places in 2017.

It is also known as the Redbird Ranger Office Complex. It also includes six non-contributing buildings and six non-contributing structures.

References

Historic districts on the National Register of Historic Places in Kentucky
National Register of Historic Places in Clay County, Kentucky
Park buildings and structures on the National Register of Historic Places